The following is a list of Wikipedia articles of the types of weapons that were in use during the post-classical historical period (roughly between the mid 1st to mid 2nd millennia AD).

Offensive weapons

Melee weapons

Trauma and cleaving weapons 

 Battle axe
 Bec de corbin
 Bludgeon
 Club
 Flail
 Flanged mace
 Horseman's pick
 Mace
 Morning star
 Quarterstaff
 Shestopyor, Pernach
 War hammer

Swords and hilt weapons 
Swords can have single or double bladed edges or even edgeless. The blade can be curved or straight.

 Arming sword
 Dagger
 Estoc
 Falchion
 Katana
 Knife
 Longsword
 Rapier
 Sabre or Saber (Most sabers belong to the renaissance period, but some sabers can be found in the late medieval period)
 Shortsword
 Ulfberht (Frankish)

Spears and polearms 

 Ahlspiess
 Bardiche
 Bec de Corbin
 Bill
 Glaive
 Goedendag
 Guisarme
 Halberd
 Lance
 Lochaber axe
 Lucerne hammer
 Man catcher
 Military fork
 Partisan
 Pike
 Plançon a picot
 Ranseur
 Sovnya
 Spear
 Spetum
 Swordstaff
 Voulge
 War scythe
 War hammer

Ranged weapons 

 Bows
 Longbows
 Daikyu
 English longbow
 Welsh longbow
 Recurved bows
 Hungarian bow
 Perso-Parthian bow
 Short bows and reflex bows
 Gungdo
 Hankyu
 Mongol bow
 Turkish bow
 Crossbows
 Arbalest
 Crossbow
 Repeating crossbow
 Skane lockbow
 Stone bow
 Flamethrowers
 Byzantine flamethrower
 Pen Huo Qi flamethrower
 Gunpowder firearms
 Arquebuses
 Arquebus
 Istinggar arquebus
 Java arquebus
 Jiaozhi arquebus
 Tanegashima arquebus
 Torador arquebus
 Blunderbuss
 Hand cannons
 Baton a feu
 Bedil tumbak
 Hand cannon
 Huo Qiang lance hand cannon
 Heilongjiang hand cannon
 Huo Chong
 Meriam kecil
 Petronel
 San Yan Chong three barrel hand cannon
 Shou Chong
 Tu Huo Qiang
 Muskets
 Che Dian Chong
 Musket
 Xun Lei Chong spear five barrel revolver musket
 Musketoon
 Pistol
 Bajozutsu
 Wall gun
 Jingal
 Slings
 Kestros
 Sling
 Stave sling
 Throwing weapons
 Chakram
 Francisca
 Kunai
 Nzappa zap
 Shuriken
 Throwing knife
 Throwing spear
 Wurfkreuz (German throwing cross)

Siege weapons 

 Ballista
 Battering ram
 Bombards
 Bombard
 Byzantine bombard (Greek)
 Dardanelles bombard (Turkish)
 Dulle Griet
 Faule Grete
 Faule Mette
 Grose Bochse
 Mons Meg
 Orban bombard
 Pumhart von Steyr
 Cannons
 Abus
 Basilisk
 Byzantine fire tube
 Cannon
 Cetbang
 Chongtong
 Culverin
 Ekor lotong
 Falconet
 Fauconneau
 Hu Dun Pao cannon
 Korean cannon
 Lantaka
 Lela
 Pierrier a boite
 Pot de fer
 Prangi
 Saker
 Tarasnice
 Veuglaire
 Wankou Chong
 Xanadu cannon
 Xi Xia
 Mortar
 Organ gun
 Petrary weapons
 Catapult
 Hu Dun Pao trebuchet
 Mangonel
 Onager 
 Trebuchet
 Rocket powered weapons
 Byzantine rocket launcher
 Huo Che rocket arrow launcher
 Hwacha rocket arrow launcher
 Siege tower

Warships 

 Caravel
 Carrack
 Cog
 Fire ship
 Galleon
 Galley
 Hellburners
 Junk
 Longship
 Lou chuan (Baby ship)
 Qiao chuan (Banana ship)
 Turtle ship

Animals in war 

 Camels in warfare
 Dogs in warfare
 Elephants in warfare
 Horses in warfare
 Courser
 Destrier
 Rouncey

Defensive weapons

Shields and body armour 
While armour is not technically a weapon, its use was driven by weapon technology and was a driving force in weapon development.

 Gambeson
 Gauntlet
 Lamellar armour
 Mail
 Shield

Fortifications 
Medieval fortifications also developed in connection with the weapons that opposed them.

 Bailey
 Barbican
 Battlement
 Castle
 Citadel
 City wall
 Curtain wall
 Drawbridge
 Fortified tower
 Gate
 Keep 
 Moat
 Motte-and-bailey
 Murder-hole
 Palisade
 Portcullis

See also 

 List of medieval military technologies
 List of premodern combat weapons
 Military technology and equipment

References 

Medieval
Medieval weapons